Deanne Lundin is an American poet, and short story writer.

Life
She was born and raised in Florida and has lived in Oklahoma, Boston, California, England and Wales. She graduated from Harvard University, and University of Michigan in 1997 with an MFA. She graduated from the Eastman School of Music, with a master's in music.

She taught at University of California, Los Angeles and the University of Michigan.

Her work has appeared in Painted Bride Quarterly, The Kenyon Review, Prairie Schooner.

She lives in Ann Arbor, Michigan.

Awards
 2007 Dana Award
 Glimmertrain Short Fiction Award finalist, for "What a Man Can Carry"
 1997 Hopwood Award

Works
"Orange Bang"; "The Ginseng Hunter Thinks About Oranges in October ", Michigan Today
"Empire", Opium Magazine

Criticism
"eXtreme verse", Tarpaulin Sky, Summer 05

References

External links
"Interview with Deanne Lundin", Michigan Today
"Deanne Lundin at Crazy Wisdom Bookstore"
"VIEVEE FRANCIS: (re)imagining history", Work-in-Progress Reading Series

American women short story writers
American short story writers
Harvard University alumni
University of Michigan alumni
Eastman School of Music alumni
University of California, Los Angeles faculty
University of Michigan faculty
Living people
American women poets
Year of birth missing (living people)
American women academics
21st-century American women